Kalar can refer to:

Kalar, Iraq
Kalar, Ardabil, Iran
Kalar, Chaharmahal and Bakhtiari, Iran
Kalwar (caste), Indian caste
Kalar, a Burmese term for Burmese Indians
Kalar Range, Transbaikalia, Russia
Kalar (river), Transbaikalia, Russia

See also
Kallar (disambiguation)